Anomozela is a genus of moths in the family Geometridae erected by David Stephen Fletcher in 1979.

References

Larentiinae
Geometridae genera